Cardiochilos is a  monotypic genus of flowering plants from the orchid family, Orchidaceae. The only species is Cardiochilos williamsonii.

Description
This species is a monopodial, epiphytic herb with up to 10 cm tall stems and up to 20 cm long, fleshy roots. The solitary, non-resuspinate flowers have hairy peduncles. Their heart-shaped labellum is the eponymous feature of this genus. The genus name Cardiochilos is composed of cardio from the greek kardio or kardia meaning heart, and chilos from the greek cheilos meaning lip.

Ecology
It has been found in mist forests at elevations of 2590 m above sea level.

See also 
 List of Orchidaceae genera

References 

 Pridgeon, A.M., Cribb, P.J., Chase, M.A. & Rasmussen, F. eds. (1999). Genera Orchidacearum 1. Oxford Univ. Press.
 Pridgeon, A.M., Cribb, P.J., Chase, M.A. & Rasmussen, F. eds. (2001). Genera Orchidacearum 2. Oxford Univ. Press.
 Pridgeon, A.M., Cribb, P.J., Chase, M.A. & Rasmussen, F. eds. (2003). Genera Orchidacearum 3. Oxford Univ. Press
 Berg Pana, H. 2005. Handbuch der Orchideen-Namen. Dictionary of Orchid Names. Dizionario dei nomi delle orchidee. Ulmer, Stuttgart

External links 
 

Vandeae genera
Angraecinae
Monotypic Epidendroideae genera
Monotypic plant taxa
Monotypic plant genera
Monotypic angiosperm genera